Aviair Pty Ltd, previously known as Slingair Heliwork, is an airline and air charter company based in Kununurra, Western Australia. It operates air charter services and regular passenger services. Its main bases are Kununurra Airport, Broome International Airport and Karratha Airport.

History 

Aviair was established in 1984 as Slingair Heliwork by Kerry Slingsby. Aviair began providing air services in Kununurra, Western Australia shortly after its creation.

In May 2008, Grant Kenny, Olympic Games Athlete and Ironman acquired Slingair for an unknown amount.

Slingair received the Sir David Brand Award every year from 1996 to 1998 and was a finalist in 2000.

In 2010 and 2015 Slingair supported field research for discovering rock shelters and artworks made by Aboriginal Australians in the Kimberley.

In 2016 Slingair was purchased by the owners of HeliSpirit, Michael McConachy and Geoff Hamilton. Slingair was renamed Aviair.

Further field research in the Kimberley region was supported by Aviair in 2019.

On 6 May 2020, Aviair received $1.58 million to support it through the COVID-19 pandemic as part of the COVID-19 Regional Airline Network Support Program by the Australian Government.

On 24 June 2021, Aviair announced they would commence a flight service from Derby to Broome on 16 August 2021.

Destinations 
Aviair provides scheduled services to the following destinations:

 Balgo
 Broome
Derby
 Halls Creek
 Kalumburu
 Karratha
 Kununurra
 Newman
 Port Hedland

Fleet 
As of 2021, the Aviair fleet consists of the following aircraft:

HeliSpirit, Aviair's sister company, also operates 25 helicopters:

Incidents and accidents 
 On 18 August 2011, one of Slingair's former Cessna 210 Centurion aircraft (registration VH-OCM) performed a forced landing 800 meters short of runway 12 at East Kimberley Regional Airport due to the pilot failing to switch selected fuel tanks, causing engine to stop.

On 8 August 2015, one of Slingairs's Cessna 208 Caravan aircraft (registration VH-LNH) experienced an oil leak which forced them to return to their airport of origin.

 On 16 November 2016, one of Aviair's Cessna 208 Caravan aircraft (registration VH-LNH) made a forced landing 8 km north-west of Solomon Airport, Western Australia due to an engine failure.

 On 16 April 2022, an Aviair Beechcraft Baron aircraft (registration VH-NPT) with a pilot and passenger onboard was involved in a fire during final approach for runway 12 at East Kimberley Regional Airport which resulted in a runway undershoot. The passenger was fatally injured and the aircraft was destroyed.

See also 
 List of airlines in Australia
 List of defunct airlines of Australia
 Regional Aviation Association of Australia

References

External links 
 Aviair
 HeliSpirit

Regional Aviation Association of Australia
Airlines established in 1984
Australian companies established in 1984
Companies based in Western Australia
Airlines of Australia
Transport in Western Australia